The 2019 League of Ireland Cup Final was the final match of the 2019 League of Ireland Cup, called the EA Sports Cup for sponsorship purposes, a knock-out association football competition contested annually by clubs affiliated with the League of Ireland. It took place on 14 September 2019 at the Ryan McBride Brandywell Stadium in Derry, and was contested by Dundalk and Derry City. Dundalk won 6–5 in a penalty shoot-out, following a 2–2 draw after extra-time.

Background
The League Cup was the first trophy of the 2019 League of Ireland season. The two sides had met three times in the League already, with two draws and one win for Dundalk, while Dundalk had won a second round FAI Cup tie 3–2 after extra-time. They had last won the cup in 2017, and had reached the final by defeating St Patrick's Atletic (2–1), UCD (3–1) and Bohemians (6–1).

Derry City were the League Cup holders, and had reached the final by defeating Longford Town (3–0), Finn Harps (2–1), and Waterford (4–2).

The final was broadcast live on Eir Sport. Dundalk wore their third kit for the match, which had been introduced that season as part of a fundraising partnership between the club and Temple Street Children's University Hospital. The logo of the charity replaced that of official sponsor Fyffes on the chest of the shirt.

Match

Summary
Dundalk were the pre-match favourites, however the closeness of the previous matches between the sides was notable. Derry City took a third-minute lead through David Parkhouse, following an error by Dundalk goalkeeper Aaron McCarey. Michael Duffy equalised for Dundalk in the 38th minute with a curling strike from outside the penalty area. Junior Ogedi-Uzokwe gave Derry City the lead again six minutes after half-time, when his deflected shot wrong-footed McCarey. Subsequently, two quick yellow cards for Grant Gillespie saw Derry City reduced to 10 men, and Dundalk equalised in the 69th minute through Sean Gannon. Dundalk couldn't capitalise on their numerical advantage in the remaining time, or in extra-time, which sent the final to a penalty shoot-out. Following one missed penalty each, the shoot-out moved to sudden-death with Dundalk prevailing.

Details

References

External links
 Match highlights from Eir Sport, via You Tube

League of Ireland Cup finals
League Cup Final
Cup Final
League Of Ireland Cup Final 2019
League Of Ireland Cup Final 2019